New Philadelphia can refer to:

 New Philadelphia, Illinois, USA
 New Philadelphia, Indiana, USA
 New Philadelphia, Ohio, USA 
 New Philadelphia High School
 New Philadelphia, Pennsylvania, USA
 Nea Filadelfeia, Attica, Greece; a suburb of Athens; aka "New Philadelphia"
 Nea Filadelfeia, Thessaloniki, Greece; a village; aka "New Philadelphia"

See also

Philadelphia (disambiguation)
Ionikos New Philadelphia
West Lafayette-New Philadelphia Road, Ohio, USA
New Philadelphia-Uhrichsville Road, Ohio, USA